Splatoon 2: Octo Expansion is an expansion pack to the single-player mode of Splatoon 2, a third-person shooter video game for the Nintendo Switch. It was released on June 13, 2018. The DLC received generally positive reviews.

Gameplay

Octo Expansion follows the story of an Octoling that goes by the name of Agent 8. Their main mission is to reach the surface by collecting four objects called thangs through various challenges. Using points as a currency, the player must navigate various subway stations and use their points to complete said challenges. The number of points gained or lost is determined by the player's performance in the challenge. These challenges range from defeating enemies within a time limit, guiding a giant 8-ball, battling a boss, and more. Players can access each level through the subway map in the hub world.

Plot
Players take control of an amnesiac, unconscious Octoling who is found by the character Cap'n Cuttlefish. Cuttlefish was seeking out Agent 3, the protagonist of Splatoon, and decides to help the Octoling after hearing them humming the Squid Sisters' song “Calamari Inkantation”. Cuttlefish and Agent 8 are trapped in a subway-like testing facility called the Deepsea Metro, where a talking telephone identifies the player-character as Applicant 10,008, prompting Cuttlefish to give them the title Agent 8. The Telephone informs them that in order to reach "the promised land", they must traverse through the Metro to collect four objects known as "thangs". Agent 8 is given assistance via radio by Pearl and Marina of the pop band Off the Hook. As Agent 8 clears tests in the underground facility, they obtain small items called Mem Cakes that serve as physical manifestations of their lost memories. After completing several test chambers and collecting all four thangs, which combine into a large blender, the Telephone attempts to kill Agent 8 and Cuttlefish by tricking them into getting into it. However, they are rescued by Agent 3, who is promptly knocked unconscious in the process. Agent 8 then climbs through the depths of the facility towards the surface via a hole that Agent 3 left in the ceiling, while Cuttlefish stays behind to keep watch over Agent 3. As they reach the exit, Agent 8 is confronted by Agent 3, who has been brainwashed by the Telephone. Agent 8 defeats them, freeing them from their mind control.

After reaching the surface, the trio is retrieved by Pearl and Marina, but the facility itself begins to rise from the ocean, revealing itself to be an enormous statue of a human, which shocks everyone due to humans having been extinct for several millennia. From within the statue, the mangled but still functional Telephone introduces itself as Commander Tartar, an AI built by a human scientist prior to mankind's extinction who was programmed to pass the knowledge of humanity on to the next sentient race that emerged after the world flooded. While initially believing Inklings and Octarians to be this sentient race, Tartar was disgusted with both their societies and instead reprogrammed itself with a new objective: to destroy all sentient life and create a new apex species from a genetic ooze made from the finest test subjects. As it prepares to fire an enormous solar-powered cannon from the mouth of the statue and destroy Inkopolis, Marina creates a plan to stop it from charging by covering the statue in ink. The plan is successful, but the statue plans to fire anyway. Pearl uses a voice-powered Princess Cannon weapon to counter the laser and finally destroy both it and Tartar. With the threat averted, the group returns to Inkopolis Square, where Agent 8 joins a community with both the Inklings and their fellow Octolings that had already arrived.

Development
Development of Octo Expansion began during Splatoon 2 series of free updates. Octolings had been considered to be made playable in Splatoon 2, but this was initially rejected for as they felt it would be jarring for Octolings to show up in a non-antagonistic role without explanation. Producer Hisashi Nogami wanted to create the expansion in part to allow players to explore deeper into the series' world. The setting of a subway station was chosen as a desire to have a darker setting to contrast the series' otherwise "bright and colorful" world. It was designed to have an older, dated aesthetic, featuring characters who speak in outdated slang. He wanted to represent the setting by having different creatures than the world of Splatoon and Splatoon 2 based on creatures who live on the ocean floor. He also wanted to represent the different setting by putting players in control of an Octoling for the first time in the series to show the difference between the Octoling's and Inkling's culture. It was also designed to give players more details on Pearl and Marina.

The levels were designed to have as much variety as possible and featured cut content from the base Splatoon 2 release. 150 levels were designed for the game, which was later pared down to 80. The final level was depicted in a 30-page manga that art director Seita Inoue created to serve as a reference for direction. The idea behind the final boss was an idea that director Yusuke Amano had wanted to do since the first Splatoon game. The developers added the CQ Point system as a way to create tension and give players more choice in how they play the game. It also served as a check-and-balance system for the "trial-and-error gameplay."

Octo Expansion was announced in a Nintendo Direct broadcast on March 8, 2018. Released on June 13, 2018, the expansion provides a new single-player mode with eighty missions starring an Octoling (formerly of the evil Octarians) known as Agent 8, who attempts to escape from a cavernous subway system without their memories. For the first time, Octolings are playable in online matches if the expansion's levels are beaten. The expansion was made available to pre-order shortly after its announcement, with exclusive in-game clothing items available for doing so. A new amiibo set featuring the Octoling Girl, Boy, and Octopus was released on December 7, 2018. A physical version of Splatoon 2 with the DLC included was exclusively sold in Japan on October 8, 2021. On April 22, 2022 "Octo Expansion" was added as a benefit for the Nintendo Switch Online + Expansion Pack.

Reception

Octo Expansion holds an aggregate score of 82 and 81.64% on Metacritic and GameRankings respectively.

Chris Carter of Destructoid rated the game 7/10, stating that while some parts were "a unique rush that fills you with satisfaction for beating them", others were tedious. Christian Donlan of Eurogamer named the title a "Recommended Pick", saying that it was difficult, but had "brilliant" puzzles resembling the shrines from The Legend of Zelda: Breath of the Wild.

References

Splatoon
Nintendo Entertainment Planning & Development games
Third-person shooters
Video game downloadable content
Video game expansion packs
Video games developed in Japan
Video games scored by Toru Minegishi
Video games scored by Ryo Nagamatsu
Fiction about mind control